The Shoe is a 1998 German-Latvian drama film directed by Laila Pakalniņa. It was screened in the Un Certain Regard section at the 1998 Cannes Film Festival.

Cast
 Ivars Brakovskis as Militiaman Kristaps
 Igors Buraks as Andrej
 Viktors Čestnovs as Roberts
 Andrejs Garnavl as Lieutenant
 Vadims Grossmans as Volodja
 Jevgeņijs Ivaničevs as Major Johanson
 Alna Jaunzeme as Nina
 Vilke Līmans as Vilka
 Jaan Tätte as Juhan
 Oļegs Teterins as Master Sergeant Manedov
 Aija Uzulēna as Jautrite
 Irina Yegorova as Roberts's wife

References

External links

1998 films
Latvian drama films
1990s Russian-language films
Latvian-language films
1998 drama films
Films directed by Laila Pakalniņa
German black-and-white films
German drama films
Latvian black-and-white films
1990s German films